The Ticinese dialect is the set of dialects, belonging to the Alpine and Western branch of the Lombard language, spoken in the northern part of the Canton of Ticino (Sopraceneri); the dialects of the region can generally vary from valley to valley, often even between single localities, while retaining the mutual intelligibility that is typical of the Lombard linguistic continuum.

Ticinese koiné refers instead to a koiné form used by speakers of local dialects (particularly those diverging from the koinè itself, as, e.g., Leventinese, etc.) when communicating with speakers of other Western Lombard dialects of Ticino, the Grisons (collectively known as Swiss Italian) or Italian Lombardy.

Status

Ticinese is generally more lively than the Western Lombard varieties spoken in Italy, with a significant number of young speakers. Some radio and television programmes in Ticinese, mostly comedies are broadcast by the Italian language broadcasting company RTSI.

A dictionary and some studies on the Ticinese variants are published by CDE – Centro di dialettologia e di etnografia, a cantonal research institution.

Examples

Some possible expressions and idioms:

See also 
 Swiss Italian

References

Bibliography 
 Centro di dialettologia e di etnografia, LSILessico dialettale della Svizzera italiana, Bellinzona 2004.
 Comrie, Bernard, Matthews, Stephen and Polinsky, Maria: The Atlas of Languages: The Origin and Development of Languages Throughout the World. Rev. ed., New York 2003.
 Lurà, Franco: Il dialetto del Mendrisiotto, Mendrisio–Chiasso 1987.
 Lurati, Ottavio: Dialetto e italiano regionale nella Svizzera italiana, Lugano 1976.
 Petrini, Dario: La koinè ticinese (Romanica Helvetica vol. 105), Bern 1988.
 VSI – Vocabolario dei dialetti della Svizzera italiana'', Lugano / Bellinzona 1952–.

External links
 Dialectal lexicon of Italophone Switzerland - Official dictionary for the dialect
 RTSI: Acquarelli popolari - Media files in Ticinese (site metalanguage and some media files are in Italian
 Examples of Italian and Ticinese idioms with meanings (Lugano)
 Examples of Italian and Ticinese idioms with meanings (Basso Mendrisiotto)

Languages of Switzerland
Culture in Ticino
Western Lombard language